David Tarka (born 11 February 1983 in Perth, Western Australia) is a retired Australian association footballer, who played two games for the national team.

Club career
Tarka was an Australian youth international and was an Australian schoolboy international in 1999. Tarka helped the Australia under 20 team qualify for the 2003 World Youth Championships in the UAE and played in the Australia under 23 team's 2004 Olympic Games Qualifiers. Tarka turned down a chance for a trial at West Ham in April 2003, instead staying in Australia to help Perth Glory win the NSL championship. In the middle of 2003 Tarka moved to Nottingham Forest in England for a fee of £100,000.

International career
Tarka earned two full international caps against Vanuatu and Solomon Islands in 2004.

A-League career statistics 
(Correct as of 2 February 2009)

Honours 
With Australia:
 OFC Nations Cup: 2004
With Perth Glory:
 NSL Championship: 2002-2003
Personal honours:
 Perth Glory Most Glorious Player Award: 2006-2007
 Perth Glory Player's Player of the Year: 2006-2007
 Perth Glory Young Player of the Year: 2006-2007
 Australian Electrician of the Year 2010,2011,2012,2013,2014,2015,2016,2017,2018,2019,2020,2021

External links
 Perth Glory profile
 Oz Football profile

1983 births
Living people
Australian people of Polish descent
Sportsmen from Western Australia
Australian soccer players
Australia international soccer players
Olympic soccer players of Australia
A-League Men players
Perth Glory FC players
Nottingham Forest F.C. players
People educated at John Curtin College of the Arts
Australian expatriate soccer players
Expatriate footballers in England
Australian expatriate sportspeople in England
Soccer players from Perth, Western Australia
Footballers at the 2004 Summer Olympics
2004 OFC Nations Cup players
Association football defenders